Dominique Mainon (April 4, 1970 – January 25, 2012) was an American author, screenwriter and filmmaker living in Laguna Beach, California.

Mainon was also noted as a transhumanist and futurist. Speaking on a radio interview with Dr. James Hughes, the Executive Director The Institute of Ethics and Emerging Technologies and author of Citizen Cyborg, Mainon revealed that one of her latest books in progress was an extensive study and reference about the changing role of androids, robots and cyborgs in cinema and pop-culture. She was also completing Suburban Apocalypse: The Debasement of the American Dream in Cinema, a book co-written by Scott Tapio.

Early years

Dominique Mainon was born to a British mother and a Texan father and spent much of her early years in the small village of Barripper in Cornwall, England where she lived with her Grandparents, attended PenPonds school, and first gained interest in the arts. As a teenager she traveled Europe independently and attended high school at the Gymnasium Juvenaat in Bergen Op Zoom in The Netherlands where she learned to speak Dutch.

Adulthood

In 2004, Mainon was diagnosed with breast cancer. During her time enduring chemotherapy and radiation she collaborated with James Ursini to write her first book, The Modern Amazons: Warrior Women On-Screen where she alludes to her experience in the  first quote appearing in the introduction of the book which says "Amazon women cut off their right breast in order to better aim their arrows" and explains the significance of the one-breasted amazon archetype.

In 2005, Mainon tracked down the author of My Jihad: One American's Journey Through The World of Usama Bin Laden—as a Covert Operative for the American Government, Aukai "Aqil" Collins and located him in prison in Durango, Mexico, on a weapons charge for bounty hunting. She began communicating with Collins on regular basis with the intent of making a film of his life story and co-writing a sequel book. In May 2006, Collins was released from prison in Mexico and dropped off in El Paso, Texas, after which they began work on a documentary about his experiences in Mexico and other countries called "Have Gun Will Travel" and she worked on adapting his book "My Jihad."

Mainon went on to write two more books and then suffered a recurrence of cancer which led to a mastectomy and severe illness through 2008. Blackie's surfer Kerry Pedlow and many others in the longboard surfing community in Orange County came together in a  8 hour surf-a-thon to raise awareness and funds for Mainon. Several cast members of Bravo TV's reality series The Real Housewives of Orange County including Jeana Keough, Vicki Gunvalson and Tammy Knickerbocker also came together to organize a  benefit to raise money for her medical expenses.

Mainon recovered again and worked in the fashion industry, producing behind-the-scenes films for brands such as Sasson, Seven and Rerock jeans, as well as Kitson LA, Rockstar Original and Elite Model's Fashion in collaboration with internationally recognized photographer Daniel Siboni of Innerspace Galleries.

Mainon's cancer recurred, leaving her paralyzed before her death in a nursing home near her Joshua Tree home on 25 January 2012.

Non-Fiction Books
 The Modern Amazons: Warrior Women On-Screen (2006)
 Cinema of Obsession: Erotic Fixation and Love Gone Wrong in the Movies (2007)
 Movie Icons: Mae West (2008)
 The Femme Fatale: Cinema's Most Unforgettable Lethal Ladies (2009)

She has  contributed to other books such as:
 
 Gangster Film Reader, edited by Alain Silver and James Ursini, and co-authored 
 "Mae West" which is part of the Taschen Movie Icons Series edited by Paul Duncan.

References

External links

Seattle Times: Books, Dec. 2007
Publishers Weekly Fall 2007
SciFi.com Listing
Author's Home Site
Windy City Times Interview
LeonardMaltin's PIcks
Von Diven und Sängern
Housewives Pink Hope Benefit for Dominique Mainon
Aukai Collins Video Channel
Changesurfer Radio

Bibliography
Cinema of Obsession: Erotic Obsession and Love Gone Wrong in the Movies Hal Leonard Press/Limelight Editions
The Modern Amazons: Warrior Women On-Screen Amadeus Press/Limelight Editions()
Mae West (Movie Icons Series) Taschen
Femme Fatale: Cinema's Most Unforgettable Lethal Ladies Hal Leonard Press/Limelight Editions

1970 births
2012 deaths
American non-fiction writers
Writers from Los Angeles